ACE Rent a Car is a privately held car rental company founded in 1966 and based in Indianapolis, Indiana.

History

Robert Sorensen and Ken Osterand, native Chicagoans and lifelong friends, first ventured into business together by opening two car washes in Indianapolis (5800 W. Washington St. & 3433 W. 16th St.) under the name, Speedway Auto Laundry, in 1957. 

In 1966, in order to meet the demand for car rental from the surrounding neighborhoods, the two men added 10 Volkswagens to their business, operating under the Airways Rent A Car brand until early 1969.  

Later that year, with an interest in expanding their operations to the Indianapolis International Airport, Sorensen, Osterand and nine other Airways Rent A Car operators, broke away from the Airways system and co-founded the now defunct American International (AI) Rent a Car franchise system.

Osterand retired in 1978, leaving Sorensen the sole owner, and by 1986, his operations had grown to several locations throughout Indiana and the Chicago area. It was in that year, after several years of experimentation and dissatisfaction with the system, that Sorensen finally broke off from AI and launched the ACE Rent A Car brand. In doing so, ACE, under Sorensen's leadership, became an early adopter of the emerging Global Distribution Systems (GDS), such as Sabre, PARS, and Apollo. This level of brand exposure helped lay the foundation for the launch of ACE's licensee network that same year.

Following Sorensen's death in 1995, his nephew Richard Radzis and long-time employee, Charlie Mullen, took over as primary owners. Over the next 19 years, Radzis and Mullen expanded the footprint of their 3,000 vehicle business into Arizona, Minnesota and Texas, before selling their rental operations to Avis Budget Group in 2014, while still retaining ownership of the ACE Rent A Car brand, licensee system and proprietary software. 

As of 2020, the ACE Rent A Car brand had more than 300 licensed locations in over 45 countries, and is now the largest system of independent rental car operators in the world

Awards 
In 2011, ACE was ranked highest in customer satisfaction in the J.D. Power & Associates annual industry consumer survey. In 2012, ACE was named one of fifty J.D. Power Customer Service Champions across twenty service industries.

Customer Experience Ratings

 = JD Power Customer Service Champion

References

External links

 Company Website

Companies based in Indianapolis
Privately held companies of the United States
Car rental companies of the United States
American companies established in 1966
Retail companies established in 1966
Transport companies established in 1966
1966 establishments in Indiana